The 1968 Copa Libertadores Finals was the final two-legged tie to determine the 1968 Copa Libertadores champion. It was contested by Argentine club Estudiantes de La Plata and Brazilian club Palmeiras. The first leg of the tie was played on 2 May at Estudiantes' home field, with the second leg played on 7 May at Palmeiras'. Estudiantes and Palmeiras played in their 1st and 2nd Copa Libertadores finals, respectively. Palmeiras last appearance was in 1961, in which they were beaten by defending champions Peñarol. Estudiantes was appearing in their first ever final ever.

Estudiantes won the series after winning a tie-breaking playoff 2-0 at Montevideo's Estadio Centenario.

Qualified teams

Venues

Rules
The finals will be played over two legs; home and away. The team that accumulates the most points —two for a win, one for a draw, zero for a loss— after the two legs will be crowned the champion. Should the two teams be tied on points after the second leg a playoff was at a neutral venue will become the next tie-breaker. Goal difference is going to be used as a last resort.

Route to the Finals
Palmeiras qualified to the 1968 Copa Libertadores as the 1967 Taça Brasil champions, defeating Náutico 2-0 in a playoff played at the Estádio do Maracanã. This was Palmeiras' second title in the competition. Estudiantes qualified as runners-up of the 1967 Torneo Nacional. The team did win the 1967 Metropolitano after defeating Copa Libertadores holders Racing Club.

First round

Estudiantes was drawn into Group 1 alongside Independiente, winners of the 1964 and 1965 editions of this tournament, and Colombian sides Deportivo Cali and Millonarios. The Pincharatas surprisingly cruised to the second round, assuring qualification, with a match to spare, after a run of 4 consecutive victories and a tie. Estudiantes defeated Independiente 2-4 in Avellaneda and won 0-1 and 1-2 in Colombia against Millonarios and Deportivo Cali, respectively. A 3-0 victory at home against Deportivo Cali was followed by a 0-0 draw vs Millonarios, which assured Estudiantes place into the second round. Estudiantes will beat Independiente 2-0 in their last match of this phase.

Palmeiras was drawn into Group 5. They were joined by fellow Brazilian club Náutico and Venezuelan outfits Deportivo Portugués and Deportivo Galicia. Like Estudiatnes, Palmeiras started their campaign well with a 5-victory streak that assured them of a place in the second round, with Tupãzinho, Ademir and Servílio being key players for the Verdão (tying 0-0 in their last, meaningless match against Náutico). The first match saw Palmeiras win in Recife 1-3 against Náutico. Two 1-2 away victories against the Venezuelan teams was followed by 1-0 win over Deportivo Galicia and a 2-0 triumph over Deportivo Portugués.

Second round and Semifinals

The second round was another group phase. Estudiantes were drawn in Group A alongside Independiente and Universitario. Universitario gave Estudiantes their first defeat in the tournament, 1-0, in Lima. However, Estudiantes came back strongly to win the rest of their matches. The Pincharatas defeated, once again, Independiente home and away (1-0 and 1-2, respectively) and secured their place in the Semifinals with a 1-0 triumph over Universitario. In Group C, Tupãzinho, Ademir and Servílio continued to shine as Palmeiras made their way into the last four of the competition. A 4-1 rout of Universidad Católica was followed by a disappointing 2-0 defeat to Guaraní. Two hard-earned wins, one 0-1 scoreline in Santiago against Universidad Católica and a 2-1 win at home vs Guaraní, was enough to get Palmeiras through.

In the Semifinals, Estudiantes played against defending champions Racing. The first leg was played in La Plata. Estudiantes won the match 3−0 with goals from Roberto Perfumo and a brace from the emerging figure Juan Ramón Verón. The second leg, played at Avellaneda, was won by Racing 2-0 with goals by Humberto Maschio and Rubén Fucceneco. Since the series was tied on points (2-2 each), a playoff in Buenos Aires was contested; it ended in a 1-1 draw with Juan Carlos Cárdenas and Verón scoring for each of their clubs. Since the match finished in a tie, goal difference was taken into account and Estudiantes advanced to the finals.

Palmeiras' semifinal match-up was against Peñarol, three-time winners of the Copa Libertadores, in a rematch of the 1961 final which Peñarol won. This time, Palmeiras started out well winning the first leg, played at home in São Paulo, with a 1−0 with the goal coming from Tupãzinho. The second leg, played in Montevideo, ended with a 1-2 scoreline in favor of Palmeiras with a brace by Tupãzinho. Héctor Silva scored the manyas lone goal. With a point aggregate of 4-0, Palmeiras advanced to the finals.

Matches

First leg

Second leg

Playoff

References

1
1968
l
l
1968 in Argentine football
Copa
Football in Buenos Aires Province